Reginald Lanier Hopwood (February 5, 1906 – July 4, 1984) was an American Negro league outfielder.

A native of Marlin, Texas, Hopwood played for the Kansas City Monarchs in 1928. He died in Minneapolis, Minnesota in 1984 at age 78.

References

External links
 and Seamheads

1906 births
1984 deaths
Kansas City Monarchs players
Baseball outfielders
Baseball players from Texas
People from Marlin, Texas
20th-century African-American sportspeople